UTC−11:00 is an identifier for a time offset from UTC of −11:00. This time is used in Niue, American Samoa, Swains Island, and parts of the United States Minor Outlying Islands. This is the latest inhabited time zone, meaning this is the last inhabited time zone to celebrate the New Year, as the world's latest time zone (UTC-12:00) is completely uninhabited.

As standard time (year-round)
Principal settlements: Alofi, Pago Pago, Tafuna

Oceania

Pacific Ocean

Polynesia
Niue
United States – Samoa Time Zone
American Samoa
United States Minor Outlying Islands
Jarvis Island
Kingman Reef
Midway Atoll
Palmyra Atoll

Formerly within
Kiribati
Phoenix Islands (of which only Canton Island is inhabited) (Phoenix Islands Time) advanced 24 hours to the eastern hemisphere side of the International Date Line by skipping December 31, 1994.
New Zealand
Tokelau – Time in Tokelau advanced 24 hours to the eastern hemisphere side of the International Date Line by skipping December 30, 2011.
Samoa – Time in Samoa advanced 24 hours to the eastern hemisphere side of the International Date Line by skipping December 30, 2011.
United States
Bering Standard Time – Before Alaska Standard Time was adopted across almost all of Alaska (other than the Aleutian Islands, which adopted the Hawaii–Aleutian Time Zone) in 1983, Nome, and the Aleutian Islands were previously in Bering Standard time.

References

UTC offsets

es:Huso horario#UTC−11:00, X